(alternatively spelled in the Latin ) was the first harbour specifically constructed to be a base for the Roman western naval fleet, the ; the eastern fleet was based in the Port of Ravenna. The port was located at Misenum on a peninsula at the northern end of the Gulf of Naples. Portus Julius was named in honour of Octavian's (later to become  Caesar Augustus) great-uncle and adoptive father, Julius Caesar and the Julian clan.

Construction of Portus Julius
During the civil wars, Octavian needed a safe naval harbour in which to build and train a fleet for a campaign against Sextus Pompeius (younger son of Pompey the Great) who was making frequent raids on Italy and upon the shipping routes for Rome's grain supply. To run the operation, Octavian turned to his closest and most able associate, Marcus Agrippa. 

Agrippa knew that Lake Averno was invisible from the surrounding sea and bay waters, and reasoned that the fleet's existence there could be kept secret from Sextus' navy until it was ready to strike. Agrippa's plan, executed from 37-36BC, was to dig a canal to connect Lake Averno to Lake Lucrino and a second, shorter canal with a hidden entrance between Lake Lucrino and the sea. 
A long road access tunnel, the Grotta di Cocceio, was also dug from Lake Averno north to the town of Cumae.

Agrippa's innovative strategy was validated as construction of the new fleet remained unknown to Sextus' roving fleet. When it was complete, fully outfitted and trained, Agrippa's fleet left its secret base and defeated Sextus at the Battle of Naulochus (off the north coast of Sicily), the decisive naval battle of the campaign.

Abandonment and new harbour at Misenum

Shortly after the successful conclusion of the war with Sextus, the first Portus Julius was abandoned, owing to accumulations of silt that compromised its navigability. With secrecy no longer a requirement, nearby Misenum became home to a second and larger version of the naval base. The Romans built new breakwaters and the base was fed by the Aqua Augusta, an aqueduct which also supplied Cumae, Neapolis, Pompeii and other towns around the bay.

The outer harbour behind Cape Misenum served the active vessels of the Roman navy and provided room for training exercises, while its inner counterpart (to which it was connected by a canal crossed by a wooden bridge) was designed for the reserve fleet and for repairs, and as a refuge from storms. Because of its location, the area controlled the entire Italian west coast, the islands and the Straits of Messina.

Present state
The waters of Portus Julius may still be seen today, though much smaller since one of the original lakes of the Roman port, Lake Lucrino, was greatly reduced in size by the volcanic appearance of a large hill in the middle of the lake in the 16th century, a hill now called  ("new mountain"). Shifting coastlines over the centuries have also put a number of the original harbour facilities under water; some of them may be seen from glass-bottom boats or by scuba-diving.

See also

List of Roman cisterns
Roman navy
Nemi ships
Caligula's Giant Ship
Classis Britannica
Classis Flavia Moesica
Classis Ravennas

References

 Aucelli PPC et al., Ancient Coastal Changes Due to Ground Movements and Human Interventions in the Roman Portus Julius (Pozzuoli Gulf, Italy): Results from Photogrammetric and Direct Surveys. Water. 2020; 12(3):658. https://doi.org/10.3390/w12030658 https://www.mdpi.com/2073-4441/12/3/658#

1st century BC in the Roman Republic
Military of ancient Rome
Navy of ancient Rome
Roman sites of Campania
Ancient Roman buildings and structures in Italy
Shipyards of Italy
Archaeological sites in Campania
Ancient Roman buildings and structures in Pozzuoli
Roman harbors in Italy
Phlegraean Fields